The Carbella Bridge was a historic bridge near Gardiner, Montana crossing the Yellowstone River in Park County. The bridge carried U.S. Route 89. Constructed in 1918, it was destroyed by the 2022 Montana floods.

References

See also 

 National Register of Historic Places listings in Park County, Montana
 List of bridges on the National Register of Historic Places in Montana

National Register of Historic Places in Park County, Montana
Road bridges on the National Register of Historic Places in Montana
Bridges completed in 1918
Yellowstone River
Bridge disasters in the United States
Ruined bridges
Former bridges in the United States
2022 disestablishments in Montana